Verschuere or Verschuère is a surname. Notable people with the surname include:

 (1924–1980), Belgian comics artist
Mathieu Verschuère (born 1972), French footballer
Pol Verschuere (born 1955), Belgian cyclist

Surnames of Belgian origin